Kim Yeon-hoon (born December 23, 1984) is a coach for the KT Wiz of the KBO League. He joined KIA Tigers in 2007. He then worked at SK Wyverns from 2008 to 2015 and at KT Wiz from 2016 to 2017. He retired from playing in 2017 and is currently a coach for the KT Wiz. He graduated from Sungkyunkwan University.

References

External links 
 Kim Yeon-hoon on Mykbostats

1984 births
KT Wiz
KT Wiz coaches
Baseball coaches
Living people